ROKS Ulsan is the name of two Republic of Korea Navy warships:

, an  commissioned on 1 January 1981

Republic of Korea Navy ship names